Adama Tamboura (born 18 May 1985) is a Malian former professional footballer who played as a left back.

Club career
Born in Bamako, Mali, Tamboura began his career for Djoliba AC and on 22 August 2006, Tamboura signed a loan deal ending on 30 November with Swedish club Helsingborgs IF. On 23 November 2006, the HIF board announced that Tamboura had signed a three-year-contract with the club.

On 28 January 2010, Tamboura signed for Ligue 2 side FC Metz from Helsingborgs IF until June 2012.

In July 2012 he signed a three-year contract Danish Superliga club Randers FC.

International career
He was part of the Malian 2004 Olympic football team, who exited in the quarter finals, finishing top of group A, but losing to Italy in the next round.

Honours
Mali
Africa Cup of Nations bronze: 2013

References

External links

1985 births
Living people
Sportspeople from Bamako
Association football defenders
Malian footballers
Malian expatriate footballers
Mali international footballers
Helsingborgs IF players
Footballers at the 2004 Summer Olympics
Olympic footballers of Mali
2008 Africa Cup of Nations players
2010 Africa Cup of Nations players
2012 Africa Cup of Nations players
2013 Africa Cup of Nations players
Allsvenskan players
Ligue 2 players
Danish Superliga players
Veikkausliiga players
Djoliba AC players
FC Metz players
Randers FC players
Hobro IK players
FC Inter Turku players
Expatriate footballers in France
Expatriate footballers in Sweden
Expatriate men's footballers in Denmark
Expatriate footballers in Finland
2015 Africa Cup of Nations players
21st-century Malian people